HMS Syren was a 32-gun  fifth-rate frigate of the Royal Navy. She served during the American War of Independence, the French Revolutionary, and Napoleonic Wars. Among her more famous midshipmen were the future Rear-Admiral Peter Puget, and John Pasco, Nelson's signal officer at the Battle of Trafalgar.

References
 

Frigates of the Royal Navy
Ships built in Essex
1782 ships